The Toyota Legendary Moments series is a series of television advertisements produced over several years for the Australian Football League by its major sponsor, Toyota.

The advertisements feature comedians Stephen Curry and Dave Lawson and a footballer re-enacting one or more famous incidents from that player's career. Curry plays the straight man to Lawson, while the demeanour of the player varies depending upon that player's personality.

The re-enactments take place on a suburban field, and humorous props and set-ups are used to allow the footballer, who is usually long retired, to emulate incidents which he is no longer athletic enough to carry out. It has been reported that the advertisements are largely unscripted; Curry and Lawson arrive with various props and gags in mind, but the players themselves are not told in advance what these props or the script will be.

The series began with two advertisements, those of Wayne Harmes and James Hird, and proved to be extremely popular with television viewers. In the years that followed, new instalments were produced and released one at a time, at a rate of one or two new advertisements in each football season.  The 2012 version, starring Leigh Matthews won a Bronze medal in the DDB Award for Best 60+ Second TV/Cinema Commercial at the 2012 Melbourne Advertising and Design Awards.

In 2010, a new advertisement featured Wally Lewis, a popular National Rugby League identity.  This was the first time the campaign sought and featured a different sports code.

AFL

Wayne Harmes 
Re-enacts the game-winning goal from the 1979 Grand Final, when Carlton's Wayne Harmes dived to tap the ball from the boundary line into the goal square for Ken Sheldon. Harmes recreated the dive using a Slip 'n' Slide.

James Hird
Re-enacts the game-winning goal from Essendon's Round 3, 2004 win against the West Coast Eagles, where Hird scored the goal, then hugged a random teenage fan in the crowd. The fan is replaced with a confused-looking groundskeeper.

Peter Daicos
Re-enacts Daicos' tight-angle goal in the 1990 qualifying final. Curry, Lawson and Daicos all don mullet wigs reminiscent of Daicos' hair from the era.

Dermott Brereton
Re-enacts Brereton's heroics in the 1989 Grand Final. Brereton was knocked unconscious by a heavy shirtfront Geelong's Mark Yeates at the opening bounce. Severely winded and concussed, he was attended to by trainers then began to vomit before jogging back into the play. Only minutes later in the game, he marked and kicked an inspirational goal. He would finish with three goals in a game that Hawthorn would win by six points.

In the advertisement, Lawson plays the role of Yeates, and is implied to have hit Brereton with a large plank of wood. Brereton then regathers himself and spits out a mouthful of canned food to simulate the vomiting. They run in slow motion to simulate concussion, and Brereton kicks a goal to finish the advertisement.

Malcolm Blight
Primarily re-enacts Blight's 70m after-the-siren game-winning goal in Round 10, 1976 at Princes Park. Miniature posts are used to make the distance seem longer, and Lawson blows an airhorn at an unsuspecting Blight to represent the siren. Lawson also pokes fun at Blight for a separate incident where, running into an open goal, he confused the goal posts with the behind posts and kicked the wrong score.

Alex Jesaulenko
Re-enacts Jesaulenko's famous specky from the 1970 Grand Final. Various methods, including a trampoline, piggy-back and eventually a crane, are used to provide Jesaulenko with the elevation, while Lawson says almost nothing throughout the advertisement except for variations on commentator Mike Williamson's famous call of "oh, Jesaulenko, you beauty!"

Tony Lockett
Re-enacts various incidents from Lockett's career, including the pig at full forward incident which raised Lockett's ire, the after-the-siren behind in the 1996 preliminary final which put Sydney into its first Grand Final in more than fifty years (prompting Lawson to comment "what a huge behind!" to the heavily built Lockett, also displeasing him), and his 1300th goal, with a large crowd of people emerging from nowhere to recreate the pitch invasion.

Francis Bourke
Re-enacts Bourke's famous courageous display at Arden Street in Round 21, 1980. Bourke, after an accidental collision with a team-mate, was bleeding profusely, then moved to the forward line to score a goal to help Richmond to a narrow victory. The collision is represented as Lawson running Bourke over with a golf cart decorated in Richmond colours, the blood is replaced with tomato sauce, and the whole thing eventually degenerates into a big tomato sauce fight.

Bruce Doull
Re-enacts two incidents from Doull's career. Firstly, it focuses upon the time that Essendon's Cameron Clayton stole his headband and his team-mate Tony Buhagiar ended up with it and threw it into the Waverley Park crowd, and combined this with the time in a match against Hawthorn, he was tackled around the neck by Kevin Ablett. Bruce chased after Ablett, with the commentator say "Bruce Doull has gone berserk". Contrary to stories told, he did not have his headband stolen in the Hawthorn game however it was almost the only time the usually docile Doull lost his temper during a game. Lawson plays the part of Clayton, and while Doull blocks his first attempt at stealing the headband, Lawson eventually prevails. He charges around shouting "Bruce Doull has gone berserk!" while Doull stands motionless.

The advertisement then focuses upon the 1982 Grand Final, when he was accosted by streaker Helen d'Amico. d'Amico is also played by Lawson (in a pixellated female nude-suit), while d'Amico herself makes a Hitchcock-esque cameo as an onlooking dog-walker.

Kevin Bartlett
Re-enacts Bartlett's seven-goal performance in the 1980 Grand Final, won by Richmond by a then-record margin. Curry and Lawson try to teach Bartlett how to handpass, poking fun at his tendency to always kick for goal instead of setting up team-mates, but this only results in Bartlett stealing the ball and kicking more goals. The advertisement also features Lawson shaving his head into Bartlett's familiar combover.

Peter Hudson
Primarily re-enacts Hudson's three-goal performance in the 1971 Grand Final, and more specifically his failure to score a fourth which would have broken Bob Pratt's record of 150 goals in a VFL season. It features Hudson being knocked out by Kevin "Cowboy" Neale (represented by Lawson on a docile pony), simulates his concussion by fitting Hudson with thick glasses and spinning him in circles, and Hudson kicking his final attempt into man-on-the-mark Barry Lawrence (represented by Lawson being hit in the groin with the ball). The advertisement also re-enacts Hudson's famous arrival by helicopter to VFL Park in his only VFL game of 1973.

Leigh Matthews
Re-enacts the famous occasion when Matthews collided with and broke a behind post in a match at Windy Hill. After running into the post fails to break it, Lawson cuts a notch in the post with an axe; Matthews, Curry and Lawson then tie a rope to the top of the post and pull it down. Curry also tries to inspire Matthews to break the post by telling him that "if it bleeds, we can kill it", a quote from Predator that Matthews famously used as a coach to inspire the Brisbane Lions to an upset win against .

Michael Long
Re-enacts Long's goal in the 1993 Grand Final when he ran from the wing into the forward 50 before kicking the goal.  Lawson firstly attaches rockets to Long's shoes to help him gain speed; however, this fails, so Lawson attempts to tow Long on the back of a bicycle; however, he is too heavy, and Lawson is barely able to pedal. Lawson then emerges from behind the trees in an aeroplane, which he lands on the oval. Long stands on the wing of the plane, bouncing the ball, as Lawson drives the plane down the ground. The advertisement then cuts to Long kicking a goal from thirty metres out, which Lawson, playing the role of Stephen Silvagni, touches on the line; however, Curry declares it a goal, and he celebrates with Long, while Lawson continues to protest.

Leo Barry
The 2016 moment, revealed during the 2016 EJ Whitten Legends Game recreates Leo Barry's pack mark in the dying seconds of the 2005 Grand Final. To recreate the mark, Barry is launched off a catapult into a collection of tackling bags with players faces attached.

NRL

Wally Lewis 

Re-enacts Lewis' Game 2 and Series winning try of the 1989 State of Origin series, where, with the injuries of Allan Langer, Mal Meninga and Paul Vautin, the Queensland rugby league team had only 12 men in their team.  However, Wally scored a 40-meter try - a moment which has been described as Queensland's greatest performance.

Cricket

Steve Waugh

References

External links

http://theinspirationroom.com/daily/2005/toyota-afl-moments
http://www.thepound.com.au/?page_id=415

http://www.thepound.com.au/?page_id=415

Australian Football League
Australian television commercials
Advertising campaigns
Toyota